Autolux is a Ukrainian cargo and passenger transportation company. Founded in 1997, the company services passengers throughout Ukraine, and through partnerships with other countries, delivers cargo internationally.

History 

Autolux was founded in 1997 by the company "AAZ Trading Co". Since then, Autolux has expanded its routes and acquired new units. Initially, its cargo transportation service was domestic only. Later, international mail delivery was introduced after partnering with other international companies.

Services 

Autolux has a fleet of 180 trucks for cargo transportation services, while passenger services operates a fleet of 50 buses operating between major cities of Ukraine. Autolux also publishes a free magazine, printing 12,000 copies per month, which are distributed to passengers. Its offices and major maintenance hangars are located in Kyiv.

Destinations 
Cargo shipping destinations include the entire territory of Ukraine, and through partnerships with other companies, internationally.

Passenger bus travels through the following cities and intermediate locations.

Routes
 Kyiv - Borispol - Poltava - Kharkiv .
 Borispol - Kyiv - Lviv.
 Kyiv - Odesa.
 Kyiv - Borispol - Poltava - Dnipro - Zaporizhia .

References

Transport companies of Ukraine
Bus transport in Ukraine
Cycle manufacturers of Ukraine